Babina may refer to:

Places
 Babina, Uttar Pradesh, cantonment town in Jhansi district in the state of Uttar Pradesh, India
 Babiná, village and municipality of the Zvolen District in the Banská Bystrica Region, Slovakia
 Babina Greda, village and municipality in Vukovar-Srijem County, Croatia
 Babina Luka, village in the municipality of Valjevo, Serbia
 Babina Rijeka, village in Donji Kukuruzari municipality, Croatia
 Babina Stena, peak in Kosovo

Other uses
 Babina (film), a 2000 Ghanaian film
 Babina (frog), frog genus
 Carine Babina (born 1994), Congolese handball player